Sentebale is a registered charity founded in 2006 by Prince Harry, Duke of Sussex and Prince Seeiso of Lesotho. Sentebale helps children and adolescents struggling to come to terms with their HIV status. It provides a safe environment for them to address their mental health amongst their peers, giving them tools and knowledge.

Prince Harry met Prince Seeiso during his gap year that he spent in Lesotho and was emotionally moved to help vulnerable children and young people in the country. During the Concert for Diana, Prince Harry explained the meaning behind the charity name. "Sentebale" means 'Forget me not' in Sesotho and the name was chosen "as a memorial to the charity work of our own mothers, as well as a reminder to us all not to forget Lesotho or its children."

Lesotho has the second-highest rate of HIV in the world and there are more than 37,000 children under 14 living with HIV. The country has 360,000 orphans. Around 10 percent of all children in Lesotho are vulnerable. Sentebale aims to combat these issues and to work with vulnerable children and their communities, empowering them to reach their full potential. The charity is focused on community-led development that matches the actual needs.

After 10 years of operation in Lesotho, in November 2016, the charity launched more operations in Botswana. The annual Sentebale Polo Cup, in which Harry usually takes part, is held every year to raise money for the charity.

Issues in Lesotho

Development
Lesotho was 160th out of 187 countries in the Human Development Index and was described as having “low human development”. 43.2 percent of the population are living below the national poverty line.  The country also was 108th out of 187 for gender equality.
Importantly, gender inequality in Lesotho does not follow the pattern of the majority of Sub-Saharan Africa. For example, males have lower literacy rates, and school attendance and completion rates. This is due in part to the traditional role of males in Basotho society. They are expected to spend their time herding livestock which limits their access to education.

Health
Lesotho has a population of just 1.8 million, yet it is estimated there are at least 360,000 orphans, and 13 percent of all children are vulnerable; their rights to survival and development are not being met. Life expectancy is on average just 41.2 years.

The country has the second-highest rate of HIV/AIDS in the world. Knowledge about HIV prevention is also low. The two most common misconceptions about HIV/AIDS in Lesotho are that a person can become infected through mosquito bites or sharing food. Someone who has comprehensive knowledge of HIV is defined as someone who will "in response to a prompted question, agree that people can reduce their chances of getting the AIDS virus by having sex with only one uninfected, faithful partner and by using condoms consistently; know that a healthy-looking person can have the AIDS virus; and know that HIV cannot be transmitted by mosquito bites or by sharing food with a person who has AIDS." In Lesotho, only 38 percent of women and 29 percent of men ages 15-49 have comprehensive knowledge about HIV/AIDS. Among youth, this figure is 39 percent for women and 29 percent for men.

Sentebale's work
Sentebale focuses on supporting vulnerable children. The charity runs five key projects to enable communities to improve health, care, and education.
 Network Clubs and Camps – This programme contains three initiatives:

 Sentebale runs week-long camps for HIV-positive children. These camps are led by Sentebale and supported by volunteers and health clinics. They are intended to educate and improve the confidence of children affected by HIV.
 Network clubs for camp alumni are held twice a month. The aim of these camps is to foster “expert patients” who can educate the community and keep themselves and others safe.
 Caregiver days connect medical professionals with the children and their families. This initiative has been successful in improving AntiRetroViral therapy (ARV) LINKS adherence and community support for people affected by HIV
 Herd Boys Education Programme – providing basic education to Herd Boys. This includes maths, literacy, learning to grow their own produce, and HIV/AIDS knowledge and awareness. Sentebale supports five herd boy schools funding teachers, refurbishing properties, and providing food and educational materials.
 Care for Vulnerable Children programme – Sentebale partners with 13 community-led organisations across Lesotho providing education, care, and support to some of the most disadvantaged children; those with disabilities and those who are orphans. Sentebale supports these organisations by providing funding, training, and development support.
 School Bursaries – Sentebale offers bursaries for children to complete secondary school. These bursaries are comprehensive, covering the hidden costs of education, such as clothing, food, and educational resources.
 Letsema – A collaborative network connecting all the NGOs, grassroots organisations, and community groups in Lesotho working with vulnerable children. Letsema is a communication and planning tool for groups, enabling them to share information, tools, and successes.

Sentebale staff
Sentebale maintains a small office in the UK. The chief executive is UK-based, but all other operational staff are based in Lesotho and Botswana.

Management team
In May 2019, Richard Miller was appointed as Sentebale's new  chief executive officer, bringing more than 30 years of international development experience to the role. He has worked with a range of community-based development organisations across Africa and Asia, and been involved in international global advocacy, campaigning, and fund-raising work throughout his career.

Miller began his career with CAFOD in the mid-’80s as an Africa Programme officer, working in Ethiopia in response to the famine and in South Africa during the dying days of apartheid. He was then appointed CAFOD deputy director and subsequently worked as CAFOD's Southern Africa regional representative, living in Zimbabwe for six years. During that time, he witnessed at first hand the devastating impact of the HIV and AIDS pandemic, with so many lives lost. As a result, he is passionate about playing a part in helping achieve an AIDS-free generation.

In 2004, Miller was appointed chief executive of ActionAid UK and helped transform the charity from being a UK-led organisation to a more diverse globally led organisation. In 2015, he took up the role of ActionAid International Humanitarian Director.

Trustees

Johnny Hornby was appointed chairman of the board in March 2018.

Sentebale's trustees are:
 Tim Boucher
 Lynda Chalker, Baroness Chalker of Wallasey
 James Marshall
 Tsitsi Chawatama
 Mark Dyer
 Damian West

History
The charity's first accounts, published in March 2008, showed that despite raising more than £1 million in the first 18 months of its operation, just £84,000 was handed over to projects in Lesotho. In the same period, however, Sentebale spent £190,000 on salaries, £86,000 on a website, £26,000 on equipping its office in Maseru, and £47,000 on work done before the charity was formally established. Sentebale's director in Lesotho, Harper Brown, had received a salary and benefits package worth between £90,000 and £100,000 per year.

In 2009, Lord Ashcroft donated £250,000 to Sentebale to remedy financial difficulties at the charity.
A new chief executive, Kedge Martin, joined in 2009. Before joining Sentebale, Martin was the CEO of WellChild, a charity that provides care, support, and research to sick children in the UK.

The 2010 report and accounts showed £2.089 million had been raised for the charity with £1.334 million being spent on charitable activities. This was an increase in funds raised by 16 percent. 72 percent of expenditure was spent on supporting orphans and vulnerable children in Lesotho; 27 percent was spent on fundraising and 1 percent on governance.

In 2016, ITV filmed a documentary by Russ Malkin called Prince Harry in Africa that followed the prince as he visited Lesotho and talked about Sentebale's work.

In September 2021, it was alleged that Prince Charles's aide Michael Fawcett had fixed a CBE for Saudi businessman Mahfouz Marei Mubarak bin Mahfouz who donated more than £1.5 million to royal charities contrary to section 1 of the Honours (Prevention of Abuses) Act 1925. Charles gave Mahfouz his Honorary CBE at a private ceremony at Buckingham Palace in November 2016, though the event was not published in the Court Circular. This led to an investigation by the Scottish Charity Regulator. Mahfouz had met Prince Harry in 2013 and 2014 and donated £50,000 to Sentebale and £10,000 to Walking With The Wounded, of which Harry is patron. The Sunday Times claimed that the meetings with Harry opened the way for Mahfouz to get access to the Prince of Wales. Harry referred to the incident as the "CBE scandal" in December 2021 and stated that he severed ties with Mahfouz in 2015 after expressing "growing concerns" about his motives, though aides from his father's household denied having any discussions with him regarding Mahfouz. A spokesperson for Sentebale defended the meetings and added that there was not any impropriety regarding the donations. Leaked emails from 2014 between Mark Dyer, a Sentebale trustee, and Mahfouz's representative showed that Mahfouz initially offered a £1 million donation in exchange for a visit by Harry to him and his family, after which Dyer raised concerns about a cash-for-access ploy. He also responded that their agreement on a donation was not "about [Mahfouz] meeting [Prince Harry] and introducing him to his friends" but "about the children of Lesotho and Sentebale making a difference", adding that the possibility of Harry visiting Saudi Arabia and meeting Mahfouz existed, "but to be held over a barrel, I think is wrong."

References

External links
 

Children's charities based in the United Kingdom
Charities based in London
HIV/AIDS organisations in the United Kingdom
Prince Harry, Duke of Sussex
British Royal Family charities
Medical and health organisations based in Lesotho
Foreign charities operating in Lesotho
2006 establishments in Lesotho